ANC Rental Corporation (“ANC Rental”) was a Delaware corporation, created in October 1999 by AutoNation, Inc. as a wholly owned subsidiary.

The company owned Alamo Rent A Car, National Car Rental, CarTemps and was a 2000 AutoNation spin-off to its shareholders, made public on July 3, 2000. With a fleet of 214,000 cars (2002), the business serviced both business and leisure travelers using 3,200 in-airport and near airport locations in the US, and 69 other countries, including Canada, Mexico, the Caribbean, Latin America, Asia, the Pacific Rim, Europe, and Middle East.

Revenue was $2.4B US as of December 31, 2002, including $338 million from non-USA operation, mostly from the United Kingdom.

Autodaq Corp. (Menlo Park, Calif.), a subsidiary to help remarket cars via online auctions.
On November 13, 2001, the company filed for protection under US bankruptcy Chapter 11 in Wilmington, DE. The filling did not include its international or Canadian operations, nor its independent franchisees.

In 2003, the company changed its name to Vanguard Car Rental USA Inc.

Egan owned Alamo before it was merged into AutoNation.

References

Defunct companies based in Oklahoma
Holding companies established in 1999
Enterprise Holdings
1999 establishments in Oklahoma